Pacto de Sangre is a Spanish phrase meaning "blood compact". It may refer to:

Blood compact (Pacto de sangre in Spanish or Sanduguan in Filipino), an ancient ritual in the Philippines.
Sandugo, a "pacto de sangre" in 1565 between leaders of the Spaniards and Filipinos.
El Pacto de Sangre, an 1886 painting by Filipino painter and hero Juan Luna.
Pacto de Sangre (album), a 2004 studio album released by Los Tigres del Norte.
Pacto de Sangre (TV series), a 2018 Chilean telenovela.